Ingrid Keményová-Svensson (born 8 September 1947), is a Swedish chess player, Women's Chess Olympiad individual silver medalist (1974).

Biography
In the first half of 1970s Ingrid Keményová-Svensson was one of Sweden's leading chess players.

Ingrid Keményová-Svensson played for Sweden in the Women's Chess Olympiads:
 In 1972, at second board in the 5th Chess Olympiad (women) in Skopje (+3, =1, -4),
 In 1974, at first reserve board in the 6th Chess Olympiad (women) in Medellín (+4, =3, -2) and won individual silver medal,
 In 1976, at second board in the 7th Chess Olympiad (women) in Haifa (+4, =1, -3).

Ingrid Keményová-Svensson played for Sweden in the Nordic Chess Cups:
 In 1972, at sixth board in the 3rd Nordic Chess Cup in Großenbrode (+2, =0, -2),
 In 1976, at sixth board in the 7th Nordic Chess Cup in Bremen (+1, =4, -0) and won team gold medal.

Since 1990 Ingrid Keményová-Svensson has rarely participated in chess tournaments. She was a practitioner psychiatrist in Stockholm.

References

External links
 
 
 

1947 births
Living people
Swedish female chess players
Chess Olympiad competitors